EuroVelo 3 (EV3), named the Pilgrims Route, is a EuroVelo long-distance cycling route running  running from Trondheim in Norway to Santiago de Compostela in Spain. This north-south route travels through Europe passing successively through seven countries: Norway, Sweden, Denmark, Germany, Belgium, France and Spain.

The route
, the EV3 is partially complete. It runs through the following countries and towns: the connections with other EuroVelo routes are given in parentheses, e.g. (EV15).

In Norway
Trondheim (EV1), Røros, Lillehammer, Oslo.

In Norway, the EV3 follows the Norwegian National Cycle Route 7, from Trondheim through Lillehammer and Oslo to Moss. From Moss the EV3 follows the Norwegian National Cycle Route 1 through Fredrikstad and Sarpsborg to the Swedish border at Halden. (Note that this last stretch, from Moss to the border, follows the same route as the EV12.)

In Sweden
Strömstad, Lysekil, Stenungsund, Gothenburg (EV12)

In Sweden, the EV3 follows the bike path known as the Cykelspåret på Västkusten. (Again, the EV3 is the same route in Sweden as the EV12.)

In Denmark
Frederikshavn (EV12), Aalborg, Viborg, Padborg (EV10)

The route leads from the port of Frederikshavn on the north coast through the cities of Aalborg, Hobro, Viborg, Vejen, Vojens, Rødekro and Padborg to Kruså at the border with Germany .

In Germany
Flensburg (EV10), Hamburg (EV12), Bremen, Münster (EV2), Düsseldorf (EV4, EV15), Cologne (EV4, EV15), Bonn (EV4, EV15), Aachen.

In Germany, the EV3 follows the entire length of the German Cycling Network D-Route D7. From Flensburg the EV3 continues to follow the Hærvejen path (in Germany called the Ochsenweg) to the cities of Schleswig, Rendsburg, Hohenwestedt, Itzehoe and Elmshorn to Hamburg. From there the EV3 passes through Zeven, Bremen, Osnabrück, Münster, Haltern, Dorsten, Wesel, Rheinberg, Duisburg, Düsseldorf, Cologne, Bonn, the Rhine river, Euskirchen to Aachen.

In Belgium
Liège, Namur (EV5), Charleroi.

In Belgium, the EV3 is not yet fully finalised. It will pass through Liège, Huy, Andenne, Namur, Sambreville, Charleroi, Thuin and Erquelinnes.

In France
Compiègne, Paris, Orléans (EV6), Tours (EV6), Bordeaux, Saint-Jean-Pied-de-Port.

It passes through the cities of Maubeuge, Fourmies, Compiègne, Senlis, Paris, Melun, Montargis, Orleans, Blois, Tours, Chatellerault, Poitiers, Angoulême, Bordeaux, Mont-de-Marsan, Dax, Saint-Jean-Pied-de-Port though the route has not been finalised between the Loire and the Pyrenees.

In Spain
Pamplona (EV1), Burgos (EV1), León, Santiago de Compostela.

The EV3 always runs close to the pilgrimage route the French Way of the Way of St. James pilgrimage to the shrine of the Apostle of Saint James the Great in Santiago de Compostela.

Gallery

See also

EuroVelo
Norwegian National Cycle Routes
Sverigeleden
Danish National Cycle Routes
German Cycling Network

References

External links

EuroVelo
Cycleways in Norway
Cycleways in Sweden
Cycleways in Denmark
Cycleways in France
Cycleways in Spain
Cycleways in Germany
Cycleways in Belgium
Camino de Santiago routes